A chicken fight is a water game. 

Chicken fight may also refer to:

 Cockfight, a fight between roosters
 Chicken (game), a confrontational game using vehicles
 Chicken fight (Family Guy), a recurring gag in the TV series Family Guy
 A South Korean game, often played during the harvest festival Chuseok